Tagalogonia is a genus of spiders in the family Theridiosomatidae. It was first described in 2014 by Labarque & Griswold. , it contains 2 species from the Philippines.

References

Theridiosomatidae
Araneomorphae genera
Spiders of Asia